The 2017 Vuelta a Castilla y León was the 32nd edition of the Vuelta a Castilla y León cycle race and was held on 19 May to 21 May 2017. The race started in Aguilar de Campoo and finished in León. The race was won by Jonathan Hivert.

General classification

References

Vuelta a Castilla y León
Vuelta a Castilla y León by year
2017 in Spanish sport